MWCD might refer to one of the following:

Muskingum Watershed Conservancy District
Metropolitan Cebu Water District
India's Ministry of Women and Child Development
Montague Water Conservation District
Merriam-Webster's Collegiate Dictionary